A title of honor or honorary title is a title bestowed upon individuals or organizations as an award in recognition of their merits.

Sometimes the title bears the same or nearly the same name as a title of authority, but the person bestowed does not have to carry out any duties, except for ceremonial ones. The title may sometimes be temporary, only valid for the individual's visit or for a single day, though they can also be permanent titles. In some cases, these titles are bestowed posthumously.

Some historical honorary titles may be bought, like certain titles of nobility. This has long been a matter of fraud, both outright and indirect. Honorary titles also serve as positions of sinecure and honorary retirement.

Examples 
Some examples of honorary titles from various areas include:

 Academician – Honorary title (academic)
 Fellow of an academic, artistic, or professional society
 Fire chief
 Freeman of the City of London
 Hero of the Russian Federation
 Honorary Colonel
 Honorary degree or position, such as honorary Professor
 Knight, Dame, or Companion of an honorific order
 Military positions (e.g. officer) and ranks (e.g. admiral), for people who are not part of the military
 New Knowledge Worker of Korea
 People's Artist
 Police chief
 Honorary counselors (neuvos) in Finland, such as valtioneuvos (Counselor of State) and vuorineuvos (Counselor of Mining)

See also
 Honorary citizenship
 Agnomen, part of the Roman naming convention
 Courtesy title, a form of address in systems of nobility used by children, former wives and other close relatives of a peer
 False titles of nobility
 Hereditary titles
 Honorary title (academic)
 Honorary titles in Russia
 Honorific
 Laqab, part of a traditional Arabic name
 List of titles
 Royal and noble styles
 Style (manner of address)
 Victory title, honorific title adopted by a successful military commander to commemorate a victory

External links
 Fake titles

Honorary titles